Almeria is an unincorporated community in Loup County, Nebraska, United States. The community was named for Almeria Strohl, the wife of the community's founder, Wess Strohl, thus being unrelated to the homonymous Spanish city. It lies along Nebraska Highway 91, 10 miles (16 km) west-northwest of Taylor, the county seat of Loup County.

References

Unincorporated communities in Loup County, Nebraska
Unincorporated communities in Nebraska